Nicky Piper MBE (born 5 May 1966) is a retired Welsh super middleweight and light heavyweight boxer from Culverhouse Cross, Cardiff. His career was at its peak in the 1990s; he became the Commonwealth Light-heavyweight champion in 1995. He was trained by Charlie Pearson and managed by Frank Warren. Since retiring from boxing, Piper has become a notable administrator in British boxing and currently works for The City Hospice as their Corporate Partnerships Manager.

Boxing career
Piper's first professional fight is recorded as being against fellow Welshman Kevin Roper. Piper won the match in the second round via a knockout. Piper then won nine of his next ten encounters, all scheduled for either six or eight rounds. Of the ten bouts, only one, against future British Heavyweight champion Maurice Core, went the full distance, resulting in a draw. Piper stopped his other nine opponents through retirement, knockout, or technical knockout. Piper's first professional loss was to future World Cruiserweight Champion Carl Thompson at York Hall on 4 September 1991, Piper being stopped by technical knockout in the third round. The next month, Piper was back in the ring, beating Franky Moro in a contest at the Royal Albert Hall. He completed 1991 with a sixth-round knockout over Carlos Christie.
 
Piper won his first three fights of 1992, all on points decisions, the first of which, over Frank Eubank, was an eliminator for the British Super Middleweight title. Another eliminator for the Super Middleweight belt saw Piper stop Johhny Melfah by technical knockout in the fifth at the G-Mex centre in Manchester. Piper's next fight was against WBC Super Middleweight champion Nigel Benn, in a challenge for the title. The twelve-round contest was held at the Alexandra Palace in London on 12 December 1992. Benn stopped Piper in the eleventh round on a technical knockout.

Despite the loss to Benn, Piper's very next match was another title fight; this time for the vacant WBA Inter-Continental light heavyweight belt. The fight against Argentinean Miguel Angel Maldonando went the distance, with Piper being given the title by unanimous points decision. Two months later, on 10 April 1993, Piper successfully defended his title against Chris Sande in Swansea. Piper completed the year with a victory over Trevor Ambrose, and a drawn match with Frank Rhodes. Piper started 1994 with a challenge for the WBO Light-heavyweight title, then held by Leeonzer Barber. Piper failed in his bid when he was again stopped by technical knockout, this time in the ninth round. Piper fought twice more in 1994, a win over Charles Oliver, and a failed bid for the vacant Commonwealth Light-heavyweight title, where he was beaten by Crawford Ashley.

Piper's next fight was a win in an uneven contest against American Tim Bryan in June 1995, followed by a victory over John Keeton, both fights held in Cardiff. Then, on 30 September, he faced Noel Magee for the Commonwealth Light-Heavyweight title. Held at the Cardiff Arms Park, the fight lasted until the ninth round, when Magee was knocked out, giving Piper his most senior belt of his career. In 1996, Piper fought in two bouts: a win over Danny Juma in Cardiff, and a successful defence of his Commonwealth belt to Bruce Scott at Tylorstown. The following year saw Piper's final two fights. In June he defeated Stephane Nizard in Norwich, before a title attempt for the WBO Light-heavyweight against Dariusz Michalczewski in Hanover. Piper was retired by his corner after the seventh round and soon after retired from boxing.

Professional boxing record

|-
|align="center" colspan=8|26 Wins (21 knockouts, 5 decisions), 5 Losses (4 knockouts, 1 decision), 2 Draws 
|-
| align="center" style="border-style: none none solid solid; background: #e3e3e3"|Result
| align="center" style="border-style: none none solid solid; background: #e3e3e3"|Record
| align="center" style="border-style: none none solid solid; background: #e3e3e3"|Opponent
| align="center" style="border-style: none none solid solid; background: #e3e3e3"|Type
| align="center" style="border-style: none none solid solid; background: #e3e3e3"|Round
| align="center" style="border-style: none none solid solid; background: #e3e3e3"|Date
| align="center" style="border-style: none none solid solid; background: #e3e3e3"|Location
| align="center" style="border-style: none none solid solid; background: #e3e3e3"|Notes
|-align=center
|Loss
|
|align=left| Dariusz Michalczewski
|TKO
|7
|4 October 1997
|align=left| , Hanover, Germany
|align=left|
|-
|Win
|
|align=left| Stephane Nizard
|PTS
|8
|28 June 1997
|align=left| , Norwich, England
|align=left|
|-
|Win
|
|align=left| Bruce "Lionheart" Scott
|TKO
|7
|30 November 1996
|align=left| , Tylorstown, Wales
|align=left|
|-
|Win
|
|align=left| Danny Juma
|TKO
|2
|26 April 1996
|align=left| Welsh Institute of Sport, Cardiff, Wales
|align=left|
|-
|Win
|
|align=left| Noel Magee
|KO
|9
|30 September 1995
|align=left| Cardiff Arms Park, Cardiff, Wales
|align=left|
|-
|Win
|
|align=left| John Keeton
|RTD
|2
|7 July 1995
|align=left| Wales National Ice Rink, Cardiff, Wales
|align=left|
|-
|Win
|
|align=left| "Terrible" Tim Bryan
|TKO
|1
|17 June 1995
|align=left| Wales National Ice Rink, Cardiff, Wales
|align=left|
|-
|Loss
|
|align=left| Crawford Ashley
|PTS
|12
|19 November 1994
|align=left| Wales National Ice Rink, Cardiff, Wales
|align=left|
|-
|Win
|
|align=left| "Prince" Charles Oliver
|TKO
|5
|21 September 1994
|align=left| Star Centre, Cardiff, Wales
|align=left|
|-
|Loss
|
|align=left| Leeonzer Barber
|TKO
|9
|29 January 1994
|align=left| Wales National Ice Rink, Cardiff, Wales
|align=left|
|-
|Draw
|
|align=left| Frank "Colossus" Rhodes
|PTS
|8
|23 October 1993
|align=left| Wales National Ice Rink, Cardiff, Wales
|align=left|
|-
|Win
|
|align=left| Trevor Ambrose
|TKO
|5
|10 July 1993
|align=left| Wales National Ice Rink, Cardiff, Wales
|align=left|
|-
|Win
|
|align=left| Chris Sande
|TKO
|9
|10 April 1993
|align=left| Swansea, Wales
|align=left|
|-
|Win
|
|align=left| Miguel Angel Maldonado
|UD
|12
|13 February 1993
|align=left| Free Trade Hall, Manchester, England
|align=left|
|-
|Loss
|
|align=left| Nigel Benn
|TKO
|11
|12 December 1992
|align=left| Alexandra Palace, London, England
|align=left|
|-
|Win
|
|align=left| Johnny Melfah
|TKO
|5
|25 July 1992
|align=left| G-Mex Leisure Centre, Manchester, England
|align=left|
|-
|Win
|
|align=left| Larry Prather
|PTS
|8
|16 May 1992
|align=left| Alexandra Pavilion, London, England, United Kingdom
|align=left|
|-
|Win
|
|align=left| Ron Amundsen
|PTS
|10
|11 March 1992
|align=left| Star Centre, Cardiff, Wales
|align=left|
|-
|Win
|
|align=left| Frank Eubank
|PTS
|10
|22 January 1992
|align=left| Star Centre, Cardiff, Wales
|align=left|
|-
|Win
|
|align=left| Carlos Christie
|KO
|6
|20 November 1991
|align=left| Star Centre, Cardiff, Wales
|align=left|
|-
|Win
|
|align=left| Franky Moro
|TKO
|4
|29 October 1991
|align=left| Royal Albert Hall, London, England
|align=left|
|-
|Loss
|
|align=left| Carl Thompson
|TKO
|3
|4 September 1991
|align=left| York Hall, London, England
|align=left|
|-
|Win
|
|align=left| Simon "Says" Harris
|TKO
|1
|3 July 1991
|align=left| , Reading, Berkshire, England
|align=left|
|-
|Win
|
|align=left| Martin "Tino" Lopez
|KO
|1
|22 May 1991
|align=left| New London Arena, London, England
|align=left|
|-
|Win
|
|align=left| Serge Bolivard
|TKO
|1
|8 May 1991
|align=left| New London Arena, London, England
|align=left|
|-
|Win
|
|align=left| John Held
|TKO
|3
|5 March 1991
|align=left| New London Arena, London, England
|align=left|
|-
|Win
|
|align=left| John Ellis
|KO
|1
|12 November 1990
|align=left| s, Norwich, England
|align=left|
|-
|Win
|
|align=left| Paul "The Beatle" McCarthy
|TKO
|3
|23 October 1990
|align=left| Granby Halls, Leicester, England
|align=left|
|-
|Draw
|
|align=left| Maurice Core
|PTS
|6
|22 May 1990
|align=left| City Hall, Saint Albans, United Kingdom
|align=left|
|-
|Win
|
|align=left| "Boxing" Darren McKenna
|RTD
|4
|17 April 1990
|align=left| New London Arena, London, England
|align=left|
|-
|Win
|
|align=left| Dave Owens
|KO
|1
|19 December 1989
|align=left| Ocean Rooms, Gorleston, England
|align=left|
|-
|Win
|
|align=left| Gus Mendes
|TKO
|3
|17 October 1989
|align=left| Star Centre, Cardiff, Wales
|align=left|
|-
|Win
|
|align=left| Kevin Roper
|KO
|2
|6 September 1989
|align=left| Afan Lido, Port Talbot, Wales
|align=left|
|}

Personal history
After his retirement from boxing, Piper became a sports commentator, and in 1997 a member of the British Boxing Board of Control. Piper served as Chairman of the Professional Boxing Association, and in 2005 he was awarded the MBE for his services to the sport. Piper is a member of Mensa, and currently works for The City Hospice (formerly George Thomas Hospice Care) as their Corporate Partnership Manager.

References

External links
 Audio commentary of the Nicky Piper v. Nigel Benn fight from 1992 BBC.co.uk
 

|-

|-

1966 births
Living people
Welsh male boxers
Super-middleweight boxers
Boxers from Cardiff
Members of the Order of the British Empire
Mensans